Podravska Moslavina is a village and a municipality in Osijek-Baranja County, Croatia. There are 1,202 inhabitants in the municipality (2011 census).

References

Municipalities of Croatia